The 38th Kerala Film Critics Association Awards, honouring the best Malayalam films released in 2014, were announced in April 2015. The awards were distributed at an event held in Trivandrum on 30 March 2016.

Winners

Main Awards
 Best Film: Ottaal and Iyobinte Pusthakam
 Best Director: Jayaraj (Ottaal) and Amal Neerad (Iyobinte Pusthakam)
 Best Actor: Manoj K. Jayan (Kukkiliyar, Negalukal)
 Best Actress: Asha Sarath (Varsham)
 Second Best Film: Ottamandaram
 Best Popular Film: Vellimoonga
 Second Best Actor – Male: Nandhu (Ottamandaram, Kukkiliyar, Alroopangal)
 Best Actor – Female: Bhamaa (Ottamandaram, Nakku Penta Nakku Takka)
 Best Screenplay: Bobby–Sanjay (How Old Are You?)
 Best Music Director: Gopi Sunder (1983, Nakku Penta Nakku Takka)
 Best Lyricist: Hari Narayanan (1983)
 Best Male Playback Singer: Sudeep Kumar (Varsham)
 Best Female Playback Singer: Madhusree Narayanan (Ottamandaram)
 Best Cinematographer: 	Amal Neerad	(Iyobinte Pusthakam)
 Best Child Artist: Ashanth K Shah (Ottaal) and Amritha Anil (How Old Are You?)
 Best Editing – Hariharaputran (Alroopangal)
 Best Sound Recordist: N. Harikumar
 Best Art Director: Boban (Angels)
 Best Make-up: Pattanam Rasheed (Chayilyam, Kukkiliyar)
 Best Costume Designer: Sameera Saneesh (Iyobinte Pusthakam)
 Best Environmental Film: Thamara – (Producer-Vijeesh Mani)
 Upcoming Actors: Nikki Galrani (1983) and Sachin Anand (Nakshathrangal)
 Upcoming Directors: Abrid Shine (1983), N. K. Muhammed Koya (Alif) and Jude Anthany Joseph (Om Shanti Oshana)

Special Jury Awards
 Special Jury Award – Adaptation: Santhosh Souparnika (Mizhi Thurakku)
 Special Jury Award – Adaptation: Suneesh Neendoor (Krishna Yaksha)
 Special Jury Award – Film: Chandrahasan (John Paul Vaathil Thurakkunnu) 
 Special Jury Award – Acting: Kumarakom Vasavan (Ottaal)
 Special Jury Award – Lyrics: Kariavattom Sreekantan Nair

Honourary Awards 
 Chalachitra Ratnam Award: K. G. George
 Chalachitra Prathibha Award: Perumbavoor G. Raveendranath, Bhagyalakshmi, Nilambur Ayisha

References

External links
 "List of recipients of the Kerala Film Critics Association Awards" (in Malayalam)

2014 Indian film awards
2014